The Canon de 155 mm Modèle 1920 was a medium-caliber naval gun used as the primary armament on a number of French cruisers during World War II.

Description
The Canon de 155 mm Modèle 1920 was built with a liner, autofretted A tube, two part jacket and breech ring.  There was a short collar at the breech end of the liner which screwed into the A tube and a Welin breech block which opened upwards.  Useful life expectancy was 700 effective full charges (EFC) per barrel.  These guns were carried both in twin turrets aboard cruisers and in single casemates aboard aircraft carriers.  The twin turrets were slightly unusual in that each gun had its own cradle and they could be elevated or depressed independently.

Ammunition
Ammunition was of separate loading type with two powder charges and a projectile.

The gun was able to fire: 
 Semi Armour-Piercing - 
 High Explosive Base Fuzed  - 
 High Explosive Nose Fuzed - 
 Illumination - Unknown

Naval Service

Ship classes that carried the Canon de 155 mm Modèle 1920 include:
 Aircraft carrier Béarn
 Cruiser Jeanne d'Arc
 Duguay-Trouin-class cruisers

Notes

References

External links 
 navweaps.com

Naval guns of France
155 mm artillery